The Iskandar Coastal Highway (ICH) (formerly Johor Bahru West Coast Parkway) (Malay: Lebuhraya Pesisir Pantai Iskandar (LPPI)) or the stretch of road that includes Lebuhraya Sultan Iskandar, Persiaran Sultan Abu Bakar (formerly Jalan Skudai, Jalan Abu Bakar) and Persiaran Sultan Ismail (formerly Jalan Ibrahim and Persiaran Tun Sri Lanang) (Federal Route 52 (Iskandar Puteri–Danga Bay) and Johor State Route 1 (Danga Bay–City Centre)) is a highway in Johor Bahru District, Johor, Malaysia. The 23 km (14 mi) highway connects Iskandar Puteri in the west to Johor Bahru in the east. It is a toll free highway and part of the Iskandar Malaysia project. The Iskandar Coastal Highway is the fifth east–west-oriented expressway in the Iskandar Malaysia area after the Pasir Gudang Highway, the Pontian–Johor Bahru Link of the Second Link Expressway, the Senai–Desaru Expressway and the Johor Bahru East Coast Highway.

Route background
The Kilometre Zero of the Federal Route 52 is located at Bulatan Ledang roundabout in Iskandar Puteri.

The Kilometre Zero of Johor State Route J1 is located at Johor Bahru city centre and the milestone is located near the Johor Bahru City Hall (Majlis Bandaraya Johor Bahru (MBJB)) main headquarters.

History
it used to be known as the Johor Bahru West Coast Parkway. The 8 km (5 mi) parkway was a part of Federal Route 1 before Skudai Highway was built. However, the importance of Johor Bahru as a trade centre for Singaporeans after the separation of Singapore from Malaysia in 1965 became the major factor of the construction of Skudai Highway. Skudai Highway bypasses the portion which becomes the present-day Johor Bahru West Coast Parkway. As a result, the two-lane Jalan Skudai was recommissioned as Johor State Route 1. The two-lane Jalan Skudai became the main coastal road in Johor Bahru as the main alternative to Skudai Highway.

In 1996, the construction of Persiaran Tun Sri Lanang as a separate carriageway for JB West Coast Parkway was completed, as a part of the Johor Bahru Waterfront project. However, the project was abandoned due to very high cost, leaving Persiaran Tun Sri Lanang and Lot 1 as the only 2 structures completed for the project.

In 2002, the government of Johor proposed the Danga Bay project, not only to revive the former Lagun Puteri and Pantai Lido, but also to boost the economy of west Johor Bahru. The Danga Bay project included a 4-km upgrade of the two-lane Jalan Skudai as a dual carriageway. The road upgrade was completed by the end of 2003.

New Coastal Highway (Iskandar Puteri–Danga Bay)
Following the establishment of the Iskandar Development Region (IDR) (now Iskandar Malaysia) on 30 July 2006, the New Coastal Highway linking Iskandar Puteri from Danga Bay was announced. These include the six new interchanges along the highway such as Skudai-TAR interchange, Taman Perling diamond interchange, Bukit Indah diamond interchange, Nusajaya North cloverleaf interchange, Legoland Malaysia interchange and the Iskandar Puteri roundabout interchange. Construction began on 2008 and was completed in August 2011. The Johor Bahru West Coast Parkway and the New Coastal Highway has now combined to become Iskandar Coastal Highway.
    
In 2013, the stretch between Nusajaya and Danga Bay which known as Lebuhraya Sultan Iskandar was gazetted as a Federal Route 52.

Coastal Highway Southern Link
The 5.2 km Coastal Highway Southern Link is an extension of the Iskandar Coastal Highway that linking Medini in the northeast to Port of Tanjung Pelepas Highway interchange of the Second Link Expressway in the northwest.  The turnkey contractor for the highway project are Sunway Group and SJIC Bina Sdn Bhd, which is a fully owned unit of Iskandar Investment Berhad. Construction began in 2015 and opened on 29 November 2017.

Features
 Iskandar Coastal Bridge
 It is a main route to Legoland Malaysia.
 Act as a protocol route from Kota Iskandar to Johor Bahru.

At most sections, the Federal Route 52 and Johor State Route J1 was built under the JKR R5 road standard, allowing maximum speed limit of up to 90 km/h.

There are no alternate routes, or sections with motorcycle lanes.

Overlaps
 Lebuh Kota Iskandar (Ledang Roundabout–Iskandar Puteri Roundabout Interchange)
 J106 Jalan Sungai Danga (Taman Perling–Kampung Sungai Danga)

List of interchanges

Iskandar Puteri–Danga Bay

Danga Bay–Istana Besar

Jalan Tun Dr Ismail and Jalan Ibrahim (City centre bound)

Persiaran Tun Sri Lanang (Danga Bay bound)

References

Highways in Malaysia
Johor Bahru District
Malaysian Federal Roads
Roads in Iskandar Puteri
Expressways and highways in Johor